Pamela D. Stevenson is an American politician from Kentucky. She is a Democrat and represents District 43 in the State House.

Stevenson graduated with a Bachelor of Science degree in business from Indiana University Bloomington in 1981, and in 1984 with a Doctorate of Jurisprudence from Indiana University Maurer School of Law. She retired after 27 years from the U.S. Air Force as a colonel. Stevenson has also served as an adjunct professor at the University of Louisville Brandeis School of Law.

References 

Living people
Democratic Party members of the Kentucky House of Representatives
21st-century American politicians
Year of birth missing (living people)
African-American state legislators in Kentucky
Women state legislators in Kentucky
21st-century American women politicians
Politicians from Louisville, Kentucky
Women in the United States Air Force
Indiana University Bloomington alumni
21st-century African-American women
21st-century African-American politicians